Samuel Jordan Cane (born 13 January 1992) is a New Zealand rugby union rugby player. His regular playing position is as a loose forward. He currently plays for Chiefs and Bay of Plenty. 

Cane made his international debut for New Zealand in 2012. On 5 May 2020 Cane was named the captain of the All Blacks, succeeding Kieran Read.

He has played for the Chiefs in Super Rugby, Bay of Plenty in the National Provincial Championship and King Country Rugby Union in the Heartland Championship.

Career

Early career
Cane represented New Zealand Under-20 in the 2011 IRB Junior World Championship.

In 2012 he made his international debut for New Zealand, in the second match of a three match series against Ireland. His starting debut came in the final match of the series in front of his home crowd in Hamilton, giving a stand out performance that included 16 tackles and two tries. Cane made another three test appearances that year.

Cane was a regular starter for the All Blacks during 2013 due largely to All Black captain Richie McCaw being on sabbatical. Cane was one of the team's top try-scorers in 2013 scoring his fifth try of the year on 2 November when the All Blacks beat Japan 54-6. Cane also received the first yellow card of his international career in the final minute of that game.

He was a key member of 2015 Rugby World Cup winning team, where he captained the side to a comfortable 58 - 14 win over Namibia.Cane came off the bench in the knockout rounds of the World Cup, replacing retiring All Blacks captain Richie McCaw in the last minute of the 34-17 victory over Australia in the tournament final on 31 October 2015.

2016–2017
Following Richie McCaw's retirement, Cane has become an established member of the Chiefs and All Blacks leadership groups, being named as co-captain of the Chiefs alongside Aaron Cruden. Cane became a regular starter for the All Blacks in 2016, starting in all three tests of the 2016 Steinlager series against Wales. Although he had a sub-par game in the third test, receiving the second yellow card of his career, the All Blacks would go on to win the series 3-0.

2016 was a mixed season for Cane, largely due to injury and having to lend his starting jersey to Matt Todd and rookie Ardie Savea. Cane captained the All Blacks for the second time in his career, playing a full 80 minutes as captain during a 68-10 win over Italy on 12 November 2016. Cane only lasted 18 minutes the following week against Ireland, leaving the field for a head injury assessment and being replaced by Savea for the rest of the 21-9 win .

2017 season was much better for Cane. He captained the Chiefs to the semi-finals of Super Rugby and was selected in the All Blacks' 33-man squad for the 2017 Pasifika Challenge against Samoa and the three-test series against the touring British and Irish Lions. Cane scored the final try of the 78-0 thrashing of Samoa and started in all three tests against the Lions, playing very well. He retained his spot as a regular starter for the 2017 Rugby Championship and began to play for the full 80 minutes more regularly, causing Savea to get less game time. Cane made five appearances for New Zealand on the 2017 end-of-season tour and scored two tries, making headlines alongside replacement prop Ofa Tu'ungafasi for great tackles in the third Bledisloe Cup, a 18-23 loss which was also his 50th cap.

On 18 November 2017, Cane became the third-to-most yellow-carded All Black in history, receiving the third of his career during a 22-17 win over Scotland. Cane made headlines again the following week for his work rate against Wales in the final test of the year, the All Blacks winning 33-18 after Cane and winger Rieko Ioane delivered standout performances. Cane was tipped by media to Captain the All Blacks for the third time in his career, against Wales, but lost out to outstanding Crusaders lock and 96-test veteran Sam Whitelock.

2018–present
Cane was retained as the Chiefs' co-captain by new head coach Colin Cooper for the 2018 Super Rugby season, with departing midfielder Charlie Ngatai selected as the other captain. He performed incredibly in the Chiefs' first few games of 2018, including the opening game on 24 February 2018. In the first half, Cane outsprinted Crusaders winger George Bridge to score a solo try 50m from the goal posts. The Chiefs lost 45-23.

Despite his promising initial start to the 2018 season, Cane fell back into his regular form pattern, with an injury-enforced lack of game time causing Cane to lose form. In the absence of injured All Blacks captain Kieran Read, Cane was named by All Blacks Head Coach Steve Hansen as one of two Vice-Captains for the 2018 Steinlager series against France, alongside outside back Ben Smith, with Sam Whitelock named as Captain in Read's absence.

Cane was initially in doubt to play against France due to an abdominal injury, with Matt Todd called in as injury cover again, but managed to make the field on 9 June 2018 to play as the All Blacks beat France 52-11. Despite an outstanding team performance from the All Blacks, Cane's ill-discipline once again caused controversy. Cane and replacement prop Ofa Tu'ungafasi both tackled French winger Rémy Grosso high, causing a head clash between the three players. Grosso sustained two facial fractures, being ruled out of the rest of the series. Cane was also heavily penalised in the second test, a 26-13 win for the All Blacks. Cane was replaced by Ardie Savea only 43 minutes into the second test due to poor behaviour. Cane was subsequently dropped for the third test, with Savea starting in his place, with Matt Todd on the bench.

Following the Steinlager series against France, Cane lead the Chiefs to the Super Rugby quarter-finals, where they lost to the Hurricanes, 31-32. Cane then went on to play in five of the six fixtures, during the 2018 Rugby Championship. On 6 October 2018, Cane started in the final match of the Rugby Championship, against South Africa. Cane was only on the field for 36 minutes, before fracturing his neck during a collision with Springboks veteran loose forward Francois Louw. Cane was immediately replaced by Hurricanes loose forward, Ardie Savea, who went on to score the All Blacks' winning try, allowing them to beat South Africa 32-30. 

Sam Cane was an integral member of the Rugby World Cup 2019 All Blacks squad, appearing in nearly all the matches. 

Sam Cane replaced Kieran Read as Captain of the All Blacks on 6 May 2020

References

External links 
 

Chiefs profile
Bay of Plenty profile

1992 births
New Zealand rugby union players
New Zealand international rugby union players
Chiefs (rugby union) players
Rugby union flankers
Bay of Plenty rugby union players
Rugby union players from Rotorua
Living people
People educated at Tauranga Boys' College